Sir Kevin William Collin Ellis KBE (15 May 1908 – 22 November 1975) was an Australian politician and solicitor, elected as a Liberal member of the New South Wales Legislative Assembly.

Early life and education
Ellis was born in Grenfell, New South Wales to James Ellis, a farmer and migrant from England, and Florence Wyse. He was educated at Fort Street High School, graduated in law at the University of Sydney in 1931, and economics in 1939. He served as president of the University of Sydney Students' Representative Council in 1937 and 1938.

Career
Ellis was a Liberal candidate for Coogee at ten elections, winning seven. After an initial defeat by Labor MLA Lou Cunningham at the 1947 election, however Cunningham died the following year and Ellis won the by-election in 1948, defeating Cunningham's widow. The following seven elections over 18 years were contested by Ellis and Labor candidate Lou Walsh. Ellis retained the seat at the 1950 election, before losing it to Walsh in 1953. Ellis regained the seat in 1956, and retained it in 1959, before losing it to Walsh again in 1962. Ellis defeated Walsh in 1965 to regain the seat, defeating Walsh for a final time in 1968. Ellis retained the seat in 1971, before retiring in 1973. With the election of the Askin coalition government, Ellis was appointed Speaker of the Legislative Assembly, serving until 1973.

Personal life
Ellis married Bettie Maunsell in July 1941 and they had one daughter and one son.  He died in the Sydney suburb of Point Piper, New South Wales.

Honours
Ellis was knighted in 1969 in recognition of service as the Speaker.

Sir Kevin Ellis Prize (for the best performance in the combined Bachelor of Commerce and Bachelor of Laws degree program) until 2008, Faculty of Law/Faculty of Commerce, UNSW.

References

 

1908 births
1975 deaths
Military personnel from New South Wales
Australian people of English descent
Sydney Law School alumni
Australian solicitors
Royal Australian Air Force officers
Royal Australian Air Force personnel of World War II
Liberal Party of Australia members of the Parliament of New South Wales
Members of the New South Wales Legislative Assembly
Speakers of the New South Wales Legislative Assembly
Academic staff of the University of New South Wales
Australian Knights Commander of the Order of the British Empire
Australian politicians awarded knighthoods
People educated at Fort Street High School
20th-century Australian lawyers
20th-century Australian politicians
20th-century Australian businesspeople